FK Senica is a Slovak football team, based in the town of Senica. The club was founded in 1921.

History
FK Senica was founded in 1921. Newly created partition was rapidly progressed, but the boom dampened dark period World War II. World war almost destroyed football in Senica. Pšurný Rudolf, who was the chairman has already pre-war club, but do not allow the city faded football. The club was organized matches and tournaments. After the war he began the sport Zahorie to bloom again.

The 1962 in club annals written in bold letters. Football team got to use a new stadium. He serves footballer today. Opening of the sports complex was associated with a charity match between footballers from Senica district and the then vice-champion of the world from Chile in a convoy with Jozef Adamec.

Senica as the years gather on the sports field more and more respect. We were successful in the lower leagues even glasses. Between the absolute leader is introduced premiere in 2009–10 season, when the club began a new era.

Dušan Vrťo is the Sporting Director of FK Senica, and has offered Dundee FC to be the
club's scout in Slovakia.

In 2018–19 season the club had set a record, that was regarded as a rather negative one. On 16 February 2019 (Matchday 19), in an away game against AS Trenčín, played in Myjava, Senica fielded an entire starting line-up made up entirely of foreign players. All the substitutes were non-Slovaks as well.

Then in 2021–22 season, FK Senica was declared bankrupt. According to sport.sk, Senica is in debt with a value of up to 1 million euros. This serious financial problem even made Senica reportedly unable to pay the operational arrears on the club's official website before the COVID-19 pandemic. Even FK Senica official website, fksenica.eu had been disabled because the club had not paid operational bills since February 2020.

FK Senica's financial crisis has also caused players and club employees to reportedly not receive a salary since September 2021. As a result of the salary stagnated for seven months, it rolled out a wave of massive resignations from several players. This caused Senica to be thrown into the 3. Liga because his license was revoked.

Clubname history
 1921 – 1923 – Železná únia Senica
 1923 – 1928 – Športový klub Senica
 1928 – 1934 – AC Senica
 1934 – 1939 – FC Senica
 1940 – 1946 – ŠK Senica
 1946 – 1969 – Sokol Chemické závody (ChZ)
 1969 – 2006 – TJ/FK SH Senica (merged with FK 96 Ress Častkov)
 2006 – present – FK Senica

Honours

Domestic
 Slovak Super Liga (1993–)
  Runners-up (2): 2010–11, 2012–13
 Slovak Cup (1961–)
  Runners-up (2): 2012, 2015

Slovak League Top Goalscorer
Slovak League Top scorer since 1993–94

1Shared award

Supporters
FK Senica ultras are known as Železná únia 1921 (on the Stadium of FK Senica a sector B3 belong them). Fanclub was founded in winter 2013. FK Senica supporters friendly 1. FC Slovácko.

Rivalries
Today, FK Senica's biggest rival is Spartak Myjava. The matches between the two teams are referred to as "záhorácko-kopaničiarske derby". The first derby in the Slovak highest tier, was played on 24 August 2012, and ended 0–1 in favour of Spartak Myjava.

Sponsorship

Club partners
source
 OMS Lighting
 101 Drogerie
 NAD-RESS
 Philips
 City of Senica

Affiliated clubs
The following clubs were or are currently affiliated with FK Senica:
  Cruzeiro (2012–?)
  Arapongas (2013–?)
  ADO Den Haag (2013–?)
  GBS Academy (2019–present)
  Beşiktaş J.K. (2021–present)

Current squad
As of 10 July 2022.

For recent transfers, see List of Slovak football transfers summer 2021 and  List of Slovak football transfers winter 2021–22

Current staff

Results

League and Cup history
Slovak League only (1993–present)
{|class="wikitable"
! style="color:white; background:#B22222;"| Season
! style="color:white; background:#B22222;"| Division (Name)
! style="color:white; background:#B22222;"| Pos./Teams
! style="color:white; background:#B22222;"|Slovak Cup
! style="color:white; background:#B22222;" colspan=2|Europe
! style="color:white; background:#B22222;"|Top Scorer (Goals)
|-
|align=center|1998–99
|align=center|3nd (2. Liga)
|align=center bgcolor=green|1
|align=center|
|align=center|
|align=center|
|align=center| Vladimír Prokop (27)
|-
|align=center|1999–00
|align=center|2nd (1. Liga)
|align=center|8/(18)
|align=center|Preliminary round
|align=center|
|align=center|
|align=center|  Igor Klejch (15)
|-
|align=center|2000–01
|align=center|2nd (1. Liga)
|align=center bgcolor=red|17/(18)
|align=center |Round 1
|align=center|
|align=center|
|align=center| ?
|-
|align=center|2001–02
|align=center|3rd (2. Liga)
|align=center bgcolor=green|1/(16)
|align=center|Quarter-finals
|align=center|
|align=center|
|align=center|  Jozef Dojčan (7)
|-
|align=center|2002–03
|align=center|2nd (1. Liga)
|align=center |10/(16)
|align=center|Round 1
|align=center|
|align=center|
|align=center|  Stanislav Velický (6)
|-
|align=center|2003–04
|align=center|2nd (1. Liga)
|align=center bgcolor=red|15/(16)
|align=center|Round 1
|align=center|
|align=center|
|align=center| ?
|-
|align=center|2004–05
|align=center|3rd (2. Liga)
|align=center|
|align=center|Did not enter
|align=center|
|align=center|
|align=center| ?
|-
|align=center|2005–06
|align=center|4th (3. Liga)
|align=center |
|align=center |Did not enter
|align=center|
|align=center|
|align=center| ?
|-
|align=center|2006–07
|align=center|4th (3. Liga)
|align=center|
|align=center|Did not enter
|align=center|
|align=center|
|align=center| ?
|-
|align=center|2007–08
|align=center|4th (3. Liga)
|align=center|
|align=center|Did not enter
|align=center|
|align=center|
|align=center| ?
|-
|align=center|2008–09
|align=center|4th (3. Liga)
|align=center|
|align=center|Did not enter
|align=center|
|align=center| 
|align=center| ?
|-
|align=center|2009-10
|align=center|4th (3. Liga)
|align=center|
|align=center|Did not enter
|align=center|
|align=center|
|align=center| ? 
|-
|align=center|2009–10 
|align=center|1st (Corgoň Liga)
|align=center|6/(12)
|align=center|Round 2
|align=center|
|align=center|
|align=center|  Juraj Piroska (6)
|-
|align=center|2010–11
|align=center|1st (Corgoň Liga)
|align=center bgcolor=silver|2/(12)
|align=center |Round 2
|align=center| 
|align=center|
|align=center|  Ondřej Smetana (18)
|-
|align=center|2011–12
|align=center|1st (Corgoň Liga)
|align=center|4/(12)
|align=center bgcolor=silver|Runners-Up
|align=center| EL
|align=center| Q3 ( RB Salzburg)
|align=center|  Rolando Blackburn (5)   Tomáš Kóňa (5)   Jaroslav Diviš (5)
|-
|align=center|2012–13
|align=center|1st (Corgoň Liga)
|align=center bgcolor=silver|2/(12)
|align=center|Quarterfinals
|align=center| EL
|align=center| Q2 ( APOEL)
|align=center|  Rolando Blackburn (10)
|-
|align=center|2013–14
|align=center|1st (Corgoň Liga)
|align=center|6/(12)
|align=center|Semi-finals
|align=center| EL
|align=center| Q2 ( Podgorica)
|align=center|  Juraj Piroska (13)
|-
|align=center|2014–15
|align=center|1st (Fortuna Liga)
|align=center|5/(12)
|align=center bgcolor=silver|Runners-Up
|align=center|
|align=center|
|align=center|  Jan Kalabiška (19)
|-
|align=center|2015–16
|align=center|1st (Fortuna Liga)
|align=center|10/(12)
|align=center|Round 4
|align=center| 
|align=center|
|align=center|  Jozef Dolný (5)   Jakub Hromada (5)
|-
|align=center|2016–17
|align=center|1st (Fortuna Liga)
|align=center |9/(12)
|align=center|Round 3
|align=center| 
|align=center|
|align=center|  Pirulo (4)   Samuel Mráz (4)
|-
|align=center|2017–18
|align=center|1st (Fortuna Liga)
|align=center |11/(12)
|align=center |Round 3
|align=center| 
|align=center| 
|align=center|  Frank Castañeda (5)   Oliver Podhorín (5)
|-
|align=center|2018–19
|align=center|1st (Fortuna Liga)
|align=center |8/(12)
|align=center|Semi–finals
|align=center| 
|align=center| 
|align=center|  Roberto Dias (6)
|-
|align=center|2019–20
|align=center|1st (Fortuna Liga)
|align=center|10/(12)
|align=center |Round of 16
|align=center| 
|align=center| 
|align=center|  Frank Castañeda (8)
|-
|align=center|2020–21
|align=center|1st (Fortuna Liga)
|align=center|11/(12)
|align=center|Round 3
|align=center| 
|align=center| 
|align=center|  Tomáš Malec (8)
|-
|align=center|2021–22
|align=center|1st (Fortuna Liga)
|align=center bgcolor=red|10/(12)1
|align=center|Semi-finals
|align=center| 
|align=center| 
|align=center|  Elvis Mashike Sukisa (7)
|-
|align=center|2022–23
|align=center bgcolor=black|
|align=center bgcolor=black|
|align=center bgcolor=black|
|align=center bgcolor=black|
|align=center bgcolor=black|
|align=center bgcolor=black|
|}
1 FK Senica did not obtain a licence for the 2022–23 season

European competition history

First international match versus FC Red Bull Salzburg

Player records

Most goals

Players whose name is listed in bold are still active.

Notable players
List of players which had international caps for their respective countries. Players whose name is listed in bold represented their countries while playing for FK Senica.

Past (and present) players who are the subjects of Wikipedia articles can be found here.

AFC
  Egy Maulana Vikri 
  Witan Sulaeman
CAF
  Edmund Addo
  Kay
  Cyriaque Mayounga
  Patrick Asmah
  Eneji Moses
  Wisdom Mutasa
  Désiré Segbé Azankpo
  Zezinho
  Juvhel Tsoumou
CONCACAF
  Kris Twardek
  Pedro Leal
  Rolando Blackburn
CONMEBOL
  Eric Ramírez
UEFA
  Ladislav Almási
  Marián Bochnovič
  Erich Brabec
  Juraj Chvátal
  Jaroslav Černý
  Erik Čikoš
  Martin Ďurica
  Martin Frýdek
  Andrej Hesek
  Filip Hlohovský
  Dominik Holec
  Jakub Hromada
  Luboš Hušek
  Michal Jonáš
  Juraj Kotula
  Tomáš Kóňa
  Matej Krajčík
  Filip Lukšík
  Róbert Mazáň
  Samir Merzić
  Samuel Mráz
  Juraj Piroska
  František Plach
  Tomas Radzinevičius
  Michal Šulla
  Lukáš Tesák
  Blažej Vaščák
  Dušan Vrťo

Managers

  Ladislav Hudec (1 Jul 2009 – 11 Feb 2010)
  Radim Necas (12 Feb 2010 – 31 May 2010)
  Stanislav Griga (1 Jul 2010 – 26 Apr 2012)
  Zdeněk Psotka (1 Jul 2012 – 31 Dec 2012)
  Vladimír Koník (1 Jan 2013 – 30 Jun 2013)
  Eduard Pagáč (3 Jun 2013 – 12 Mar 2014)
  Pavel Hapal (12 Mar 2014 – 23 Dec 2014)
  Jozef Kostelník (4 Jan 2015 – 8 May 2015)
  Eduard Pagáč (8 May 2015 – 8 Sep 2015)
  Juraj Sabol (8 Sep 2015 –26 May 2016 )&
  Dušan Vrťo (8 Sep 2015 –30 May 2016 )
  Aleš Čvančara (30 May 2016 – 19 Jul 2016 )
  Miroslav Mentel (19 Jul 2016 – 16 Jun 2017 )
  Ivan Vrabec (16 Jun 2017 – 11 Sep 2017)
  Ladislav Hudec (11 Sep 2017 – 8 Feb 2018)
  Ton Caanen (8 Feb 2018 – 3 Aug 2018)
  Frederico Ricardo (3 Aug 2018 – 9 Jan 2019)
  Ricardo Chéu (9 Jan 2019 – 7 Jun 2019)
  Michal Ščasný (8 Jul 2019 – 12 Feb 2020)
  Eduard Pagáč (16 Feb 2020 – 18 Feb2020)
  Patrik Durkáč (18 Feb 2020 – 7 Mar 2020)
  Ján Bíreš (7 Mar 2020 – 30 Jun 2020)
  Patrik Durkáč (30 Jun 2020 – 14 Jul 2020)
  Anton Šoltis (14 Jul 2020 – 20 Feb 2021)
  Karol Praženica (23 Feb 2021 – 2 Jun 2021)
  Pavel Šustr (2 Jun 2021 – 16 April 2022)
  Libor Fašiang (16 April 2022 – present)

References

External links 

 

 
Senica
Senica, FK
Association football clubs established in 1921
1921 establishments in Slovakia